Craig Heimburger (born February 3, 1977) is a former professional American football player.

Early years
He attended Belleville East High School. He played college football at the University of Missouri, where he earned All-Big 12 Conference honors in 1998.

Professional career
He was a 5th round pick of the Green Bay Packers of the National Football League in the 1999 NFL Draft.

In 2000, he was allocated by the Packers, to the NFL Europe to play for the Rhein Fire. The Fire won the championship and Heimburger earned all NFLE honors. He also played for the Cincinnati Bengals in 2000, and the Buffalo Bills in 2001. In 2002, he was in training camp with the Houston Texans for what was their inaugural season.

After leaving the NFL, Heimburger joined the Arena Football League. Heimburger played for the Colorado Crush (2006), and the Austin Wranglers (2007).

Personal
In 2003, he co-founded with his wife, Dawn, Heimburger Construction Company LLC, licensed in the state of Illinois.

He is married to Dawn Dugan, a former college softball player at the University of Missouri.

References

1977 births
Living people
Sportspeople from Belleville, Illinois
American football offensive linemen
American football defensive linemen
Missouri Tigers football players
Players of American football from Illinois
Rhein Fire players
Green Bay Packers players
Cincinnati Bengals players
Buffalo Bills players
Colorado Crush players
Austin Wranglers players
Cleveland Gladiators players